Emanuil Atanasov Dyulgerov (born February 7, 1955, in Razgrad) is a former hammer thrower from Bulgaria, who competed for his native country at the 1980 Summer Olympics. He set his personal best (80.64 metres) in 1984. He lives in Sofia and works as an athletics trainer. He has two daughters, called Stela Dyulgerova (not his biological daughter) and Violeta Dyulgerova.

Achievements

References

1955 births
Living people
Bulgarian male hammer throwers
Athletes (track and field) at the 1980 Summer Olympics
Olympic athletes of Bulgaria
Universiade medalists in athletics (track and field)
People from Razgrad
Universiade gold medalists for Bulgaria
Medalists at the 1977 Summer Universiade
21st-century Bulgarian people
20th-century Bulgarian people